The medial intermuscular septum of thigh is a fold of deep fascia in the thigh.

It is between the vastus medialis, and the adductors and pectineus.

It separates the anterior compartment of the thigh from the medial compartment of the thigh.

See also
Lateral intermuscular septum of thigh
Anterior compartment of thigh
Medial compartment of thigh

References

External links
 Topographical Anatomy of the Lower Limb - Listed Alphabetically from UAMS Department of Neurobiology and Developmental Sciences
 Anatomy Tables - Anterior & Medial Thigh from anatomy.med.umich.edu

Lower limb anatomy